Mount Peary is a conspicuous massif, 1,900 m, with a flat, snow-covered summit several miles in extent, surmounted by a marginal peak on the west, standing 7 nautical miles (13 km) east-northeast of Cape Tuxen and dominating the area between Wiggins and Bussey Glaciers on Kyiv Peninsula in Graham Land. Discovered by the French Antarctic Expedition, 1908–10, under Charcot and named by him for R. Admiral Robert E. Peary, U.S. Navy, American Arctic explorer and first to attain the North Pole, in 1909.

In 1976, three men in an expedition died while climbing the mountain.

See also
Mount Touring Club

References
 SCAR Composite Gazetteer of Antarctica.
 Martha Henriques: "A Frozen Graveyard: The Sad Tales of Antarctica’s Deaths," BBC Future, 13 September 2018 

Mountains of Graham Land
Graham Coast